Silver Surfer or The Silver Surfer is the name of several series of comic books published by Marvel Comics featuring the Silver Surfer.

Publication history

Volume 1
The first series, The Silver Surfer, was published beginning in 1968 and was written by Stan Lee with art by John Buscema (#1–17) and Jack Kirby (#18). Villains introduced in the series include Mephisto in issue #3 (Dec. 1968).  Spider-Man guest-starred in issue #14 (March 1970). Encounters with Thor, Loki, and The Human Torch are also some of the notable things that take place within this volume. The series ended after 18 issues, running from August, 1968 to September, 1970.

The Silver Surfer : The Ultimate Cosmic Experience by Stan Lee, Jack Kirby, and Joe Sinnott was published in September 1978 as part of the Marvel Fireside Books series and is considered to be one of the first true "graphic novels."

Volume 2
In 1982 Marvel published a Silver Surfer one-shot by Stan Lee, John Byrne, and Tom Palmer. The one-shot finds the Surfer being temporarily freed from Galactus's punishment, and attempts to rescue his missing love, Shalla Bal. Although it is a one-shot, it serves a second volume within the title.

Volume 3
The third volume series ran from 1987 to 1999 for 146 regular issues, as well as an issue number "−1", and nine annuals, making it the longest-running volume of Silver Surfer. This volume is sometimes referred to as the second Silver Surfer volume, but, according to indicia found inside the comics, the 1982 one-shot was designated "Volume 2" and Marvel therefore designated the second series, beginning in 1987, as "Volume 3."

Volume 4
The fourth series was a 1988 two-issue out-of-continuity mini-series from Stan Lee and Moebius through Marvel's Epic Comics imprint, later collected under the title Silver Surfer: Parable.

Volume 5
The fifth series started in 2004 and was written by Dan Chariton and Stacy Weiss, lasting 14 issues. Consisting of the Communion and Revelation story arcs, the fifth volume ran from September, 2003 to December, 2004.

Volume 6
The sixth series was a five-part miniseries published in 2011, written by Greg Pak with art by Stephen Segovia. Given a brief run, the sixth volume started in April, and concluded in August in the year of 2011.

Volume 7
The seventh series, written by Dan Slott and drawn by Mike Allred began in May 2014, lasting 15 issues.

Volume 8
The eighth series, again written by Dan Slott and drawn by Mike Allred, ran from March 2016 to December 2017, lasting 14 issues.

Writers

Volume 1
Stan Lee wrote all 18 issues of The Silver Surfer, beginning in 1968.  He later wrote many of the character's subsequent appearances, including the first Silver Surfer graphic novel in 1978 (published by Simon & Schuster).

Volume 2
The Silver Surfer one-shot released in 1982 was plotted and penciled by John Byrne and scripted by Stan Lee.

Volume 3
Writers for Silver Surfer vol. 3 include:

Volume 4
Stan Lee returned to the character for both issues of volume 4 published through Marvel's Epic Comics imprint beginning in 1988.

Volume 5
Dan Chariton and Stacy Weiss wrote all 14 issues of Silver Surfer volume 5, published from 2004–2005.

Volume 6
Greg Pak wrote volume 6, consisting of a five-issue miniseries released in 2011.

Volumes 7 – 8
Dan Slott wrote all 15 issues of volume 7 (May 2014 – December 2015) and all 14 issues of volume 8 (March 2016 – December 2017).

Artists

Volume 1
Volume 1 was pencilled by John Buscema and inked by Joe Sinnott, Sal Buscema, Dan Adkins and Chic Stone. Jack Kirby returned to pencil the final issue, #18, which was inked by Herb Trimpe.

Volume 2
Volume 2 was a one-shot pencilled by John Byrne and inked by Tom Palmer.

Volume 3
Marshall Rogers was the first to pencil Silver Surfer vol. 3 in 1987, followed by Ron Lim. Tom Grindberg took over from Lim and was later replaced by Scot Eaton. Ron Garney produced the artwork for several issues  until issue #130, after which various artists illustrated the series. Guest artists before issue #130 include Joe Rubinstein, Joe Phillips, Bart Sears, and John Buscema.

Volume 4

Volume 5

Volume 6

Volume 7
Michael Allred pencilled and inked volume 7 and Laura Allred was the colorist.

Volume 8
Michael Allred pencilled and inked volume 8 and Laura Allred was the colorist.

Bibliography

Original graphic novels
The Silver Surfer has featured in four original graphic novels:

The Silver Surfer: The Ultimate Cosmic Experience 114 pages, September 1978,  Fireside Books, 
Silver Surfer: Judgment Day 64 pages, June 1988, 
Silver Surfer: The Enslavers 64 pages, May 1990, 
Silver Surfer: Homecoming 64 pages, November 1991,

Additional series
The Silver Surfer has also headlined or co-headlined the following series:

Annihilation: Silver Surfer #1–4 (2006)
Captain Universe / Silver Surfer one-shot (2006)
Silver Surfer: Dangerous Artifacts one-shot (1996)
Silver Surfer vs. Dracula one-shot (1993, reprint issue)
Silver Surfer: In Thy Name #1–4 (2007)
Silver Surfer: Loftier Than Mortals #1–2 (1999)
Silver Surfer: Requiem #1–4 (2007)
Silver Surfer / Warlock: Resurrection #1–4 (1994)
Stan Lee Meets the Silver Surfer one-shot (2007)

Intercompany crossovers
Marvel has featured the Silver Surfer alongside characters from other companies in the following crossovers:

Green Lantern / Silver Surfer: Unholy Alliances (DC Comics / Marvel Comics, 1995)
Rune / Silver Surfer one-shot (Malibu Comics / Marvel Comics, 1995)
Silver Surfer / Superman #1 (Marvel Comics / DC Comics, 1997)
Silver Surfer / Weapon Zero one-shot (Marvel Comics / Top Cow Productions, 1997)
Silver Surfer / Witchblade #1/2 (Marvel Comics / Top Cow Productions / Wizard Magazine, 1997)
Weapon Zero / Silver Surfer one-shot (Top Cow Productions / Marvel Comics, 1997)

Collected editions
The character's various series have been collected into the following books:
 Son of Origins of Marvel Comics includes Silver Surfer #1, 249 pages, softcover, October 1975, Simon & Schuster, 
 Bring on the Bad Guys: Origins of the Marvel Comics Villains includes Silver Surfer #3, 253 pages, softcover, October 1976, Simon & Schuster, 
 Marvel's Greatest Superhero Battles includes Silver Surfer #4, 253 pages, softcover, November 1978, Simon & Schuster, 
Essential Silver Surfer (b/w)
Volume 1 collects Silver Surfer #1–18 and Fantastic Four Annual #5, 528 pages, softcover, February 1998, 
Volume 2 collects Silver Surfer vol. 2 #1, Silver Surfer vol. 3 #1–18, Silver Surfer Annual #1, and Marvel Fanfare #51, 600 pages, softcover, June 2007, 
Marvel Masterworks: The Silver Surfer
Volume 1 collects Silver Surfer #1–6 and Fantastic Four Annual #5, 272 pages, hardcover, June 2003, 
Volume 2 collects Silver Surfer #7–18, 280 pages, hardcover, August 2003, 
Silver Surfer Omnibus collects Silver Surfer #1–18, Fantastic Four Annual #5, and Not Brand Echh #13, 576 pages, hardcover, June 2007, 
Silver Surfer Epic Collection
Volume 1: When Calls Galactus collects Fantastic Four #48–50, #55, #57–60, #72, #74–77; material from Tales to Astonish #92–93, Fantastic Four #56, #61, Fantastic Four Annual #5, 320 pages, softcover, December 2014, 
Volume 3: Freedom collects Silver Surfer vol. 2 #1, Silver Surfer vol. 3 #1–14, Super-Villain Classic #1; material from Epic Illustrated #1 and Marvel Fanfare #51, 488 pages, softcover, December 2015, 
Volume 4: Parable collects Silver Surfer vol. 3 #15-23, Silver Surfer Annual #1–2, Fantastic Four #325, Marvel Graphic Novel No. 38 - Silver Surfer: Judgment Day, Silver Surfer vol. 4 #1-2; material from Marvel Comics Presents #1 488 pages, softcover, April 2022, 
Volume 5: The Return of Thanos collects Silver Surfer vol. 3 #24-38, Silver Surfer: The Enslavers, softcover, December 2022.
Volume 6: Thanos Quest collects Silver Surfer vol. 3 #39-50, Silver Surfer Annual #3, Thanos Quest #1-2; material from Marvel Comics Presents #50, 480 pages, softcover, May 2018, 
Volume 7: The Infinity Gauntlet collects Silver Surfer vol. 3 #51-66, Silver Surfer Annual #4; material from Marvel Comics Presents #69, #93-97, 488 pages, softcover, May 2017, 
Volume 9: Resurrection collects Silver Surfer vol. 3 #76-85, Silver Surfer Annual (1988) #6, Silver Surfer/Warlock: Resurrection (1993) #1-4 and Secret Defenders (1993) #9-10. 456 pages, softcover. 
Volume 13: Inner Demons collects Silver Surfer vol. 3 #123-138, -1, and Silver Surfer Annual '97, 464 pages, softcover, June 2019, 
The Definitive Silver Surfer collects Silver Surfer #1, Silver Surfer vol. 2 #1, Silver Surfer vol. 4 #1–2, Fantastic Four #48–50, Tales to Astonish #92–93 and The Tomb of Dracula #50, 260 pages, softcover, August 2007, Panini Comics, 
Silver Surfer: Rebirth of Thanos includes Silver Surfer vol. 3 #34–38, 224 pages, softcover, April 2006, hardcover, August 2010, 
Thor: Blood and Thunder includes Silver Surfer vol. 3 #86–88, 336 pages, softcover, July 2011, 
Silver Surfer: Parable collects Silver Surfer vol. 4 #1–2, 72 pages, hardcover, December 1988, softcover, 1998, 
Silver Surfer: Parable collects Silver Surfer vol. 4 #1–2 and Silver Surfer: The Enslavers graphic novel, 168 pages,  hardcover, May 2012, 
Silver Surfer: Communion collects Silver Surfer vol. 5 #1–6, 136 pages, softcover, June 2004, 
Silver Surfer: Requiem collects Silver Surfer: Requiem #1–4, 104 pages, hardcover, December 2007, softcover, July 2008, 
Silver Surfer: In Thy Name collects Silver Surfer: In Thy Name #1–4, 96 pages, softcover, June 2008, 
Silver Surfer: Devolution collects Silver Surfer vol. 6 #1–5, 200 pages, softcover, September 2011, 
Silver Surfer vol. 1: New Dawn collects Silver Surfer vol. 7 #1–5 and material from All-New Marvel Now! Point One, 128 pages, softcover, November 2014, 
Silver Surfer vol. 2: Worlds Apart collects Silver Surfer vol. 7 #6–10, 120 pages, softcover, June 2015, 
Silver Surfer vol. 3: Last Days collects Silver Surfer vol. 7 #11–15, 120 pages, softcover, November 2015, 
Silver Surfer vol. 4: Citizen of Earth collects Silver Surfer vol. 8 #1-6, 144 pages, softcover, October 2016, 
Silver Surfer vol. 5: A Power Greater Than Cosmic collects Silver Surfer vol. 8 #7-14, 176 pages, softcover, December 2017, 
Silver Surfer By Slott & Allred Omnibus collects Silver Surfer vol. 7 #1-15, Silver Surfer vol. 8 #1-14 and material from All-New Marvel Now! Point One, 688 pages, hardcover, December 2018, 
Silver Surfer: Black Treasury Edition collects Silver Surfer: Black #1-5, 120 pages, softcover, December 2019,

Awards
1989:
 Won "Best Finite Series" Eisner Award
 Nominated for "Best Graphic Album" Eisner Award
2016
Won "Best Single Issue/Story--Silver Surfer #11: "Never After", by Dan Slott and Michael Allred (Marvel)-Eisner Award

References

External links

1968 comics debuts
1970 comics endings
1982 comics debuts
1987 comics debuts
1988 comics debuts
2003 comics debuts
2004 comics endings
2011 comics debuts
2014 comics debuts
2016 comics debuts
American comics titles
Comics by George Pérez
Comics by Jean Giraud
Comics by Jim Starlin
Comics by J. M. DeMatteis
Comics by J. Michael Straczynski
Comics by John Byrne (comics)
Comics by Stan Lee
Comics by Steve Englehart
Comics set on fictional planets
Eisner Award winners for Best Limited Series